Boa is a discontinued since 2005 open-source small-footprint web server that is suitable for embedded applications. Originally written by Paul Phillips, it was previously maintained by Larry Doolittle and Jon Nelson.

Slashdot and Fotolog use Boa to serve images.

As of its last release, Boa has the following limitations:
 No access control features (HTTP Basic access authentication, etc.)
 No chroot option (planned)
 No Server Side Includes (deemed incompatible with server performance goals)
 No SSL support although there are some patches against 0.94.13 that introduce SSL support
As of 2022 Boa is still used in many embedded applications, and its known vulnerabilities have been actively exploited.

See also

 Comparison of web servers

References

External links

An Overview of the Boa Web Server
Boa: an Embedded Web Server
User Interface Design using CGI Programming and Boa Web Server on M5249C3 Board
Reviving boa 
Mailing List

Free web server software